The 2012–13 Segunda División season (known as the Liga Adelante for sponsorship reasons) was the 82nd since its establishment. The season started on 17 August 2012 and the league phase of 42 rounds ended on 9 June 2013. The entire season ended on 22 June 2013 with the promotion play-off finals.

Teams
A total of 22 teams contested the league, including 15 sides from the 2011–12 season, four promoted from the 2011–12 Segunda División B and three relegated from 2011–12 La Liga.

Villarreal CF, Sporting de Gijón and Racing de Santander were the teams which were relegated from La Liga the previous season. Villarreal was relegated after 12 years in La Liga, Sporting de Gijón returned to the Segunda División after a four-year tenure in La Liga, while Racing de Santander ended ten consecutive seasons in La Liga, the longest period in its history. Deportivo de La Coruña was promoted the previous season and made their immediate return to the top level, Celta de Vigo after five years in the Segunda División, and the other team promoted to La Liga as play-off winner was Valladolid after two years of absence.

The teams relegated the previous season were Villarreal B, Gimnàstic de Tarragona, Alcoyano and Cartagena. These four were replaced by four Segunda División B teams: Real Madrid Castilla (group 1 champions and 2ªB champions), Mirandés (group 2 champions and 2ªB runners-up) and the winners of third round play-offs Ponferradina and Lugo. Ponferradina made an immediate return to the second level, while Real Madrid Castilla and Lugo returned to it respectively after 5 and 19 years. Finally, Mirandés made their debut in the second level.

Villarreal B did not finish in the relegation places, but Villareal were relegated from Liga BBVA, and the rule of Spain is that two teams of the same owner cannot play in the same league, forcing Villarreal B's relegation.

Stadia and locations

Personnel and sponsorship

Managerial changes

League table

Positions by round

Results

Promotion play-offs

This promotion phase (known as Promoción de ascenso) was to determine the third team which was promoted to 2013–14 La Liga. Teams placed between 3rd and 6th position (excluding reserve teams) took part in the promotion play-offs. Fifth placed faced against the fourth, while the sixth positioned team faced against the third. The first leg of the semi-finals was played on 12 June, the best positioned team was played at home the second leg on 16 June. The final was also be two-legged, with the first leg on 19 June and the second leg on 23 June, with the best positioned team also playing at home the second leg. Girona and Almería played the final phase, where Almería was winner and promoted to La Liga after a two-year absence. Alcorcón and Las Palmas were eliminated in semi-finals.

Play-Offs

Semifinals

First leg

Second leg

Final

Awards and season statistics

Top scorers

Zamora Trophy
The Zamora Trophy is awarded by newspaper Marca
to the goalkeeper with least goals-to-games ratio.

Fair Play award
This award is given annually since 1999 to the team with the best fair play during the season. This ranking takes into account aspects such as cards, suspension of matches, audience behaviour and other penalties. This section not only aims to know this aspect, but also serves to break the tie in teams that are tied in all the other rules: points, head-to-head, goal difference and goals scored.

Source: 2012–13 Fair Play Rankings Season

Scoring
First goal of the season: Jean Marie Dongou for Barcelona B against Almería (17 August 2012)
Fastest goal in a match: 17 seconds – Máyor for SD Ponferradina against Sabadell (17 March 2013)
Goal scored at the latest point in a match: 90+5 minutes 
Ernesto Galán (own goal)  for Sabadell against Xerez (24 February 2013)
Manu Trigueros for Villarreal against Real Murcia (14 April 2013)Widest winning margin: 5Girona 5–0 Las Palmas (16 September 2012)Real Madrid Castilla 5–0 Villarreal (19 January 2013)Córdoba 5–0 Real Murcia (20 January 2013)Villarreal 6–1 Numancia (7 April 2013)Real Madrid Castilla 6–1 Mirandés (21 April 2013)Most goals in a match: 9 – Barcelona 4–5 Almería (17 August 2012)First hat-trick of the season: Gerard Deulofeu for Barcelona against Almería (17 August 2012)Most goals by one player in a single match: 3 Gerard Deulofeu for Barcelona against Almería (17 August 2012)Aníbal Zurdo for Sabadell against Almería (8 September 2012)Oriol Riera for Alcorcón against Las Palmas (8 September 2012)Chuli for Recreativo against Alcorcón (6 October 2012)Vitolo for Las Palmas against Córdoba (24 November 2012)Charles for Almería against Racing Santander (2 December 2012)Airam for Lugo against Xerez (30 March 2013)Most goals by one team in a match: 6 Villarreal 6–1 Numancia (7 April 2013)Real Madrid Castilla 6–1 Mirandés (21 April 2013)First own goal of the season: Tomás Mejías for Barcelona B against Real Madrid Castilla (25 August 2012)Most goals in one half by one team: 5 – Real Madrid Castilla 6–1 Mirandés (21 April 2013)Most goals scored by losing team: 4 – Barcelona B 4–5 Almería (17 August 2012)Discipline
First yellow card: Charles for Almería against Barcelona B (17 August 2012)First red card: Carles Planas for Barcelona B against Almería (17 August 2012)''

Attendances

Teams by autonomous community

See also
 List of Spanish football transfers summer 2012
 List of Spanish football transfers winter 2012–13
 2012–13 La Liga
 2013 Segunda División play-offs
 2012–13 Segunda División B
 2012–13 Copa del Rey

References 

 
2012-13

2
Spain